Paul Grant may refer to:
Paul Grant (basketball) (born 1974), American basketball player
Paul Grant (bodybuilder) (1943–2003), British bodybuilder
Paul Grant (footballer) (born 1993), Scottish footballer
Paul Grant (guitarist), member of 3 Colours Red rock band
Paul K. Grant, chair of the Libertarian National Committee (1983–1985)
Paul Grant (physicist) (born 1935), American/Irish physicist and science writer
Paul Grant (rugby union) (born 1987), New Zealand rugby union player